The Governor of the Gilbert and Ellice Islands was the colonial head of the Gilbert and Ellice Islands civil service from 1892 until 1979.

The post was established in 1892 with the title 'Resident Commissioner' by Governor of Fiji John Bates Thurston after the islands were made a British protectorate, having previously been under the supervision of the High Commissioner for the Western Pacific. The Commissioner initially had jurisdiction over only the Ellice Islands. Charles Richard Swayne was appointed as the first Commissioner, arriving in the islands the same year. 

In 1893 the responsibilities of Resident  were extended to cover the Gilbert Islands, with the title becoming Resident Commissioner of the Gilbert and Ellice Islands. Swayne arrived in the islands in October 1893. His salary was £500 a year, which was covered by local revenue. 

In 1895, the headquarters of the protectorate were established in Tarawa before being moved to Ocean Island in 1908, which remained the headquarters until World War II and the Japanese occupation of the Gilbert Islands. At the beginning of the Pacific War, Cyril George Fox Cartwright was acting Resident Commissioner of the Gilbert and Ellice Islands Colony on Ocean Island from December 1941 to August 1942. He was acting on behalf of Vivian Fox-Strangways, who had been appointed as Resident Commissioner, but because of the Pacific War, Fox-Strangways had been seconded into the British Army with the rank of major and was located on Tulagi in the British Solomon Islands. Following the occupation of Ocean Island by Japanese forces on 26 August 1942, Fox-Strangways established his office and headquarters on Funafuti in the Ellice Islands. On 22 November 1943 Fox-Strangways landed on Betio islet at the end of Battle of Tarawa, and began to establish the administrative centre of the colony on Tarawa, first on Betio islet and subsequently on Bairiki islet. The provisional headquarters of the colony stayed in Funafuti until 1946 and the rebuilding of Tarawa.

The Gilbert Islands and Ellice Islands became separate colonies in 1976, but remained under a single governor. After the independence of Tuvalu (Ellice Islands) in 1978, the post was renamed the Governor of the Gilbert Islands until the independence of Kiribati the following year.

List of governors

References

 
Lists of governors